is a railway station on the Toei Mita Line in Uchisaiwaichō, Chiyoda, Tokyo, Japan. Its station number is I-07.

History
 November 27, 1973: Station opened

Station layout
The station consists of a single island platform serving two tracks.

Platforms

Passenger statistics
The station saw a daily average of 45,660 passengers in 2018.

Surroundings
Hibiya Park
Imperial Hotel
Mizuho Bank
Tokyo Electric Power Company
NTT Communications
Hankyu Hanshin Hotels
Shimbashi Station
Toranomon Station

References
This article incorporates information from the corresponding article on the Japanese Wikipedia.

External links

 Toei station information

Railway stations in Japan opened in 1973
Railway stations in Tokyo
Toei Mita Line